The national anthem of the Dominican Republic, also known by its incipit Valiant Quisqueyans, was composed by José Rufino Reyes y Siancas (1835–1905), and its lyrics were authored by Emilio Prud'Homme (1856–1932).

History
José Reyes was inspired to create a national anthem for the Dominican Republic after having seen the Argentine National Anthem in the Parisian newspaper El Americano. In 1883, he invited his friend Emilio Prud'Homme to write lyrics for the anthem.

The first version of Prud'Homme's lyrics was published in the weekly newspaper El Eco de la Opinion on 16 August 1883, and the first public performance of the anthem took place the next day on 17 August in Respectable Hope Lodge No. 9 in Santo Domingo. Though the music was an instant success, several objections were made to the lyrics for having various historical inaccuracies. In 1897, Prud’Homme submitted revised lyrics, which stand to this day.

On 7 June 1897, the Congress of the Dominican Republic passed an act adopting "Himno Nacional" with the original music and revised lyrics as the country's official national anthem; however, then-President Ulises Heureaux (1846–1898) vetoed the act, because the lyric's author, Prud’Homme, was an opponent of the president and his administration. In 1899, Heureaux was assassinated, and the political disorder that ensued prevented the national anthem's legal adoption until 30 May 1934, when "Himno Nacional" was officially adopted and signed into law.

Lyrics
The Spanish name of the Dominican Republic, "", is never used in the anthem's official Spanish lyrics, nor is the demonym for Dominicans, "". Rather, the indigenous word for the island of Hispaniola, "", is used twice, and its derivative demonym, "", is used once. However, research later showed that these words do not seem to derive from the original Arawak Taíno language.

In public, the national anthem is usually performed through the end of the lyric's fourth paragraph.

References

External links
 Ceremonial performance of the Dominican Republic's national anthem
 Vocal

Dominican Republic music
National symbols of the Dominican Republic
Dominican Republic
Spanish-language songs
National anthems
National anthem compositions in E-flat major